Paul Parkinson (born 10 August 1969) is a Sierra Leonean sprinter. He competed in the men's 4 × 100 metres relay at the 1992 Summer Olympics.

References

1969 births
Living people
Athletes (track and field) at the 1992 Summer Olympics
Sierra Leonean male sprinters
Olympic athletes of Sierra Leone
Place of birth missing (living people)